Erik Nils Engström (born 14 June 1963) is a Swedish businessman, chief executive officer (CEO) of RELX, a multinational information and analytics company, operating in four market segments: scientific, technical and medical; risk and business information; legal; and exhibitions.

Early life
Erik Engström is the son of Alice Engström and Dr Kjell Engström of Täby, Sweden, who was managing director of the Swedish Museum of Natural History, Stockholm. He has a BSc from the Stockholm School of Economics, an MSc from the Royal Institute of Technology in Stockholm, and an MBA from Harvard Business School, Harvard University, where he was a Fulbright scholar.

Career
Engström has been chief executive of RELX (formerly Reed Elsevier) since 2009, having been chief executive of Elsevier since 2004. Before that, he was a partner at General Atlantic, and prior to that was president and chief operating officer of Random House Inc and, before its merger with Random House, president and chief executive officer of Bantam Doubleday Dell, North America. He started his career as a consultant with McKinsey & Company.

Personal life
In 1997, Engström married Elizabeth Hobson "Libby" Pierpont, the daughter of Elizabeth Wentworth Pierpont and Carleton Langley Pierpont, a property developer, of Darien, Connecticut at St. James' Church in New York.

References

1963 births
Living people
Swedish chief executives
KTH Royal Institute of Technology alumni
Harvard Business School alumni
McKinsey & Company people
Stockholm School of Economics alumni
Fulbright alumni